This is a list of notable Irish film directors.

A
 Lenny Abrahamson
 Meiert Avis

B
 Steve Barron
 John Boorman
 David Noel Bourke
 Stephen Bradley
 Kenneth Branagh
 Paddy Breathnach
 Herbert Brenon

C
 David Caffrey
 Michael Feeney Callan
 Graham Cantwell
 John Carney
 Declan Cassidy
 Norman Cohen
 Tom Collins
 Joe Comerford
 Fintan Connolly
 Joel Conroy
 John Crowley
 Lee Cronin

D
 Éamon de Buitléar
 Barry Dignam
 Ciaran Donnelly
 Paul Duane
 Eoin Duffy
 Martin Duffy

F
 Jason Figgis
 Jonathan Figgis
 Ian Fitzgibbon
 Ciaran Foy

G
 Terry George
 Douglas Gerrard
 Simon Gibney
 Alan Gilsenan
 Benjamin Glazer
 David Gleeson
 Domhnall Gleeson

H
 Neasa Hardiman
 Margo Harkin
 Richard Harris
 Thomas Hefferon
 Conor Horgan
 Brian Desmond Hurst

I
 Rex Ingram

J
 Graham Jones
 Neil Jordan
 Maurice Joyce

K
 Ivan Kavanagh
 Elaine Kinsella
 Eilis Kirwan

L
 David Lawless
 Maximilian Le Cain
 Peter Lennon
 Louis Lentin
 Gerard Lough
 Declan Lowney

M
 Donald Macardle
 Darach Mac Con Iomaire
 Eoin Macken
 Ruán Magan
 Mark Mahon
 Enda McCallion
 Daragh McCarthy
 Kevin McClory
 John Michael McDonagh
 Martin McDonagh
 John McDonnell
 Mary McGuckian
 Conor McPherson
 Sophie Merry
 John Moore
 Tomm Moore
 Redmond Morris
 George Morrisson
 Brendan Muldowney
 Maeve Murphy
 Nick Vincent Murphy

N
 Roy William Neill
 Neasa Ní Chianáin

O
 Ciarán Ó Cofaigh
 Pat O'Connor
 Damien O'Donnell
 Michael O'Herlihy
 David OReilly
 Thaddeus O'Sullivan

P
 Dermott Petty

Q
 Bob Quinn

R
 Mary Raftery
 Rouzbeh Rashidi
 Ruairí Robinson
 Nick Ryan
 Frank Rynne

S
 Jim Sheridan
 Kirsten Sheridan
 Gary Shore
 Jimmy Smallhorne
 Gerard Stembridge

T
 William Desmond Taylor
 Stuart Townsend
 Montgomery Tully
 Nora Twomey
 Dave Tynan

W
 Aisling Walsh
 Dearbhla Walsh
 Rick Whelan
 Juanita Wilson

See also
Cinema of Ireland

References

Film directors
Ireland
List